Cravity is a South Korean boy band formed by Starship Entertainment. The group is composed of nine members: Serim, Allen, Jungmo, Woobin, Wonjin, Minhee, Hyeongjun, Taeyoung, and Seongmin. They debuted on April 14, 2020, with their extended play Season 1. Hideout: Remember Who We Are.

The group was dubbed as "Monster Rookies" in 2020, who "emerge as a global artist that attracted attention of the fans globally." They became the first 2020 rookie artist to debut on the Billboard K-pop Hot 100, and earned numerous awards including "New Artist of the Year" at the 12th Melon Music Awards, "Best of Next" at the 2020 Mnet Asian Music Awards and "Rookie Award" in the 4th Soribada Awards.

History

Pre-debut
Prior to the group's debut, Jungmo, Wonjin, Minhee, and Hyeongjun participated in the show Produce X 101 in 2019, representing Starship Entertainment, along with Moon Hyunbin. In the finale, Jungmo and Wonjin placed at ranks 12 and 19 respectively (without taking into consideration the 'X'-position), missing the cut-off for the show's debut-lineup. However, Minhee and Hyeongjun placed at ranks 10 and 4 respectively, thereby making them members of the debut line-up and members of the group X1. They promoted with the group until their disbandment on January 6, 2020.

In March 2020, Starship began unveiling the new nine-member boy group that the agency would debut, revealing the group's name to be "Cravity". Cravity's name is an amalgamation of the words "Creativity" and "Gravity" that implies bringing you into their universe with their unique charm. Cravity, which also stands for "Center of Gravity", contains the ambition of achieving the best performance and best stage presence when all members gather together in perfect balance.

2020: Debut with Season 1. Hideout: Remember Who We Are and Season 2. Hideout: The New Day We Step Into 
Cravity debuted with the extended play Season 1. Hideout: Remember Who We Are on April 14, 2020, which debuted and peaked atop of Gaon's Album Chart. The album is reported to have shipped over 100,000 copies in the month of April 2020, making them the best-selling South Korean rookie artist in 2020, as of August 2020.

Cravity entered and peaked on the Billboard Social 50 Chart at number 12. They are the fifth fastest South Korean group to enter Social 50, as well as being the only South Korean rookie artist to chart on Billboard'''s Social 50 in 2020 at the time of their debut. On June 17, Cravity released a music video for their song "Cloud 9", a track previously included in their debut extended play. They subsequently began music show promotions for this song.

On August 5, Cravity announced they would be making their first comeback with their second extended play Season 2. Hideout: The New Day We Step Into on August 24, 2020, with the title track "Flame". This album will feature lyrics written by members Serim and Allen. On August 13, at the 2020 Soribada Awards, Cravity won the "New Artist Award", their first award since debut. On August 24, Cravity released their second album, Season 2. Hideout: The New Day We Step Into. The EP contains seven tracks, including the lead single "Flame". The album has topped the Japanese Tower Records' album chart and ranked first on seven regions on iTunes.

On September 1, Cravity had their first music show win on SBS MTV's The Show with "Flame" with the song also debuting at number 97 on the Billboard Korea K-pop Hot 100 chart on the chart issue dated week of September 26.
On September 14, the group formally released their official light stick, which they called "Remembong."

Cravity on October 9 held an exclusive on-tact fan meeting 'Cravity Collection: C-Express' through Naver V Live wherein they greeted their fans in 126 regions. The fanmeeting was organized with a theme of an "amusement park" as a way of the group to greet their fans brightly. On October 21, Cravity released a performance video for their song "Ohh Ahh", a B-side track on Season 2. Hideout: The New Day We Step Into. They subsequently began music show promotions with the song.

 2021: Season 3. Hideout: Be Our Voice and The Awakening: Written in the Stars
On January 19, Cravity released the third installment of the Hideout series with their third extended play Season 3. Hideout: Be Our Voice, along with the music video of the lead single, "My Turn". The album features some of the songs written by members Serim, Allen and Wonjin. They subsequently began promoting their title track alongside their B-side track "Mammoth" on music shows.
On March 2, it was announced that Cravity would release a performance video for their B-side track "Bad Habits" on March 11. They began promotions for the song on music shows following the video's release.

On August 19, Cravity released the first part of their first studio album The Awakening: Written in the Stars, featuring the title track "Gas Pedal". They subsequently began promoting their title track alongside their B-side track "Veni Vidi Vici" on music shows. Within the first week after its release, over 100,000 copies were sold, making it the first of Cravity's works to have reached that milestone and the first to be eligible for Hanteo certification. On September 27, it was announced that Cravity would be releasing a special video for their B-side track "Veni Vidi Vici" on October 7. After its release, the group began a second round of promotions on music shows with the song.

On November 20–21, Cravity held the two-day fan meeting 'Cravity Collection: C-Delivery', marking their first performance in a year since their solo on:tact fan gathering in October 2020. On December 15, the group announce the launch of the soon to be released Cravity character dolls where each member personally participated in the design. The characters were first shown through the group's fan meeting 'Cravity Collection: C-Delivery' held in November.

 2022: Liberty: In Our Cosmos and New Wave
On January 26, it was announced that Cravity would be making their comeback with the second part of their first studio album Liberty: In Our Cosmos, featuring the title track "Adrenaline" on February 22. On February 4, it was announced on social media that they had been chosen as special DJs for KBS Cool FM's "Station Z" radio show, with weekly appearances as units during February.

On February 12, it was announced that 7 of the 9 members had tested positive for COVID-19 (later updated to 8 of the 9 members on February 16 and all 9 on February 20) and as a result, their comeback was postponed. On February 28, it was announced that their comeback would be rescheduled for March 22. With the release of their new promotion schedule, they also announced that they would be holding their first set of solo concerts at Olympic Hall within Seoul's Olympic Park on April 2 and 3.

On March 22, Cravity released the second installment of their first studio album. The group started promoting their title track "Adrenaline" on Mnet's M Countdown. On March 30, Cravity released a choreography video for their song "Maybe Baby" from their second studio album. They subsequently began promotion of the song through SBS MTV The Show.

On April 2, the group was awarded the "Silver Creator" award by TikTok for surpassing 1 million followers on the platform. On the same day, they were announced as part of the lineup for the 'KCON 2022 Premiere' in Chicago, their first appearance at the annual music festival. On May 31, Cravity released the promotional single "Vivid" through the Universe Music platform on the mobile application Universe.

On June 30, Cravity successfully wrapped up their two-day sold-out concert entitled 'Cravity the 1st Fan–Con Center of Gravity' at Zepp Osaka Bayside in Japan. On July 20, Cravity confirmed their participation in the 'KCON 2022 US TOUR', which was held until September. The group participated as a representative of the next generation of K-pop artists, starting with 'KCON 2022 LA', held on August 19 to 21, followed by KCON editions in San Francisco, Minneapolis, Houston, Dallas, Atlanta, wrapping up their participation with 'KCON 2022 New York' on September 1.

On August 5, Cravity announced that they would be releasing their fourth mini-album New Wave in September. Ahead of the album's release, the group pre-released their first English digital single, "Boogie Woogie", on August 12. On September 27, Cravity released their fourth mini-album "New Wave", featuring the title track "Party Rock". On October 4, Cravity received their first music show win for "Party Rock" and second music show win overall on SBS MTV's The Show.

On November 6, it was announced that members Serim, Minhee, Hyeongjun, Jungmo, and Seongmin would be participating in the filming of "The Game Caterers X Starship Entertainment", representing Cravity.

 2023–present: Master: Piece 
On February 10, Cravity announced they would be releasing their 5th mini album Master: Piece, featuring the title track "Groovy". On February 19, Cravity successfully wrapped up their two-day "2023 Dear My Luvity Fan-Con," which was held at the Blue Square Mastercard Hall in Seoul. On March 6, Cravity released Master: Piece, alongside the music video of the lead single "Groovy." They subsequently began promoting their title track on music shows. On March 14, Cravity received their first music show win for "Groovy" and third music show win overall on SBS MTV's The Show.

Other ventures
Ambassadorship
In the tourism sector, Cravity has been appointed as tourism ambassadors for "K-pop Star Street" in Gwangju, the group will be doing numerous activities that will publicly promote tourist destinations of the city for one year.

In June 2022, it was announced that Cravity was selected by the Ministry of Culture, Sports, and Tourism as an overseas ambassador for Korean culture for the year 2022.

 Endorsements 
In October 2020, Cravity was chosen as the model for the cosmetic brand Blackrouge. The group's passion, powerful energy, health and vitality as a new male idol group fit well with the lively image of Blackrouge leading to them being selected as the models of the cosmetic brand. The group promoted the brand not just in Korea, but also in China and other countries in Southeast Asia. The group and Blackrouge parted ways a year later in October 2021.

In August 2022, Cravity was unveiled to be the first official model of the American casual brand Searchit. The boy group designed a hand-drawn unique design collection for the brand's t-shirt to which all the products worn by the members were sold out.

In February 2023, Cravity was announced as the new ambassador of the cosmetic brand "Make P:rem." Utilizing skincare goods from the brand, such as cleansing, soothing pads, and sunscreen, Cravity made their debut as the brand's new face through a photoshoot with Singles Korea.

 Philanthropy 

In July 2022, Starship Entertainment, along with Cravity, join hands with the Blue Tree Foundation to prevent and eradicate cyberbullying among teenagers. Starship expects the participation of Cravity and its fellow artists to not only protect the artist's rights and interests but also become another fandom culture that will change society.

In February 2023, members Serim, Minhee, and Hyeongjun, along with actor Son Heon-soo, participated in KBS 1TV's My Hometown's new corner "New Start" as part of the celebration of the 50th anniversary of the network. The appearance of the members aims to provide household goods that will help elderly and financially struggling families in farming and fishing villages organize a better home in order to help them enhance their living conditions and quality of life.

Artistry
Influences
Among professional musical influences, Cravity have named BTS, Monsta X, and NCT as their inspirations. 
In terms of personal inspirations, members Serim and Jungmo mentioned BTS V, while Wonjin cited Jimin.
Allen and Minhee both referred to Joohoney from Monsta X, and Minhee also mentioned Minhyuk. On the other end, Seongmin identified Jaehyun of NCT as his own personal inspiration.

In an interview with Allure Magazine'', the band revealed that their labelmate seniors Monsta X under Starship Entertainment were their biggest role model and influence in their careers when it came to styling and fashion. Member Jungmo singled out BTS V, describing him as "handsome, stunning, and cool."

Members

Adapted from the group's profile on Naver and Starship Entertainment's official website.

 Serim – leader, rapper
 Allen – rapper, dancer
 Jungmo – vocalist
 Woobin – vocalist
 Wonjin – vocalist, dancer
 Minhee – vocalist
 Hyeongjun – vocalist, dancer
 Taeyoung – vocalist, dancer
 Seongmin – vocalist

Discography

Studio albums

Extended plays

Singles

Promotional singles

Other charted songs

Videography

Music videos

Other videos

DVD

Filmography

Reality shows

Radio shows

Short films

Concerts and tours

Cravity The 1st Concert [Center of Gravity]

'Cravity The 1st Fan-con 'Center of Gravity'

'2023 Cravity Fan-con 'Dear My Luvity'

Concert participation

Awards and nominations

Notes

References 

Starship Entertainment artists
2020 establishments in South Korea
K-pop music groups
Musical groups established in 2020
Musical groups from Seoul
South Korean boy bands